, operating as Rising Production, is a Japanese talent agency. It largely works with musical talent, but has branched out in recent years to include actors and comedians. The company came into prominence after the widespread successes of musical acts Namie Amuro, MAX, Speed and Da Pump in the mid to late 1990s.

History
Oginome's success led to Taira becoming a producer under the pseudonym . In the fall of 1986, 12-year-old Kaori Sakagami signed with Rising Production after being invited to an Oginome concert in Nagasaki Prefecture. In 1991, the agency signed up-and-coming talent Alisa Mizuki.

In 1992, Rising Production formed a partnership with the Okinawa Actors School, which debuted the music group Super Monkey's that year. Super Monkey's would later evolve into two separate acts: Namie Amuro and MAX. Speed, Da Pump, Rina Chinen, Daichi Miura, and Folder 5 were also products of the partnership.

In 2001, Taira was arrested for tax evasion. Taira served a 30-month prison sentence before returning to the company. In 2003, the agency ended its partnership with the Okinawa Actors School.

In the fall of 2006, Vision Factory opened the website Vision Cast and the record label Rising Records.

On December 11, 2014, the agency announced it would revert to its original name Rising Production.

Rising Production has hosted several charity events to help victims of disasters such as the Great East Japan earthquake in 2011, Typhoon Haiyan in the Philippines in 2013, and the 2016 Kumamoto earthquakes.

Representative list of notable present and past clients

Music

Solo 

 Akina
 Namie Amuro
 Asuka
 Rina Chinen
 Yumiko Fukuhara
 Kenichi Fujikawa
 Amika Hattan
 Asuka Hinoi
 Hitoe
 Eriko Imai
 Issa
 Ryoko Kuninaka
 Daichi Miura
 Alisa Mizuki
 Nobutoshi Nakamura
 Mariya Nishiuchi
 Yōko Oginome
 Olivia
 Kaori Sakagami
 Hiroko Shimabukuro
 Keita Tachibana
 Airi Taira
 Nana Tanimura
 Takako Uehara

Bands and groups 

 Ai-Sachi
 AN-J
 Asian2
 Aya & Chika from D&D
 D-Loop
 D&D
 Da Pump
 Earth
 Fairies
 Flame
 Folder
 Folder 5
 Fuwafuwa
 Hinoi Team
 Hipp's
 Lead
 MAX
 Nakanomori Band
 Ota Crew
 Rockamenco
 Speed
 Tourbillon
 Vanilla Mood
 W-inds
 Zero

Others
 Nao Asahi (Former Idoling!!!)
 Manami Higa (actress)
 Yukari Taki (actress)

References

External links 
 

Talent and literary agencies
Entertainment companies established in 1985
Japanese talent agencies
Privately held companies of Japan